Greg McKeown may refer to:

 Greg McKeown (author), British business writer
 Greg McKeown (soccer), American soccer player